The 1881 Grand National was the 43rd renewal of the Grand National horse race that took place at Aintree near Liverpool, England, on 25 March 1881.

Finishing Order

Non-finishers

References

 1881
Grand National
Grand National
19th century in Lancashire
March 1881 sports events